Rachael Taylor (born 1984) is an Australian actress and model.

Rachael or Rachel Taylor may also refer to:

 Rachael Taylor (rower) (born 1976), Australian rower
 Rachael Taylor (academic) (born 1971), New Zealand childhood nutrition academic
 Rachel Taylor (rugby union) (born 1983), Welsh rugby union player
 Rachel Annand Taylor (1876–1960), Scottish poet